Abel Sánchez: A Story of Passion is a 1917 novel by Miguel de Unamuno. Abel Sanchez is a re-telling of the story of Cain and Abel set in modern times, which uses the parable to explore themes of envy.

Plot
Abel Sánchez is a version of the Biblical story of Cain and Abel. The Cain of the novel is named Joaquin. Though they are not brothers, they have grown up together, competing as brothers would. Abel becomes a famous and recognized painter while Joaquin becomes a well-known doctor. Joaquin's goal is to outdo Abel by making medical discoveries, thus competing with Abel's art by excelling at science, which also is an art. Joaquin always has been jealous of Abel and competitive with him, but what bothers him most is that Abel does not feel the same sense of rivalry. Abel marries Helena, Joaquin's cousin, whom Joaquin hoped to wed. To allay his envy and hatred, Joaquin marries Antonia, not out of love but simply to maintain his competitive standing with Abel. Abel and Helena have a son named Abelin, Joaquin and Antonia have a daughter named Joaquina. Joaquin lives out his jealous ambitions through his daughter. As the story of Cain and Abel ends, so does this novel. Reaching the point of utter hatred, Joaquin takes Abel's life. When Joaquin dies, he apologizes to his family. Realizing that his life was consumed by hatred and envy, he says that if only he had loved his wife, Antonia, she could have been his savior.

Replete with biblical comparisons, this book shows what one's life becomes when one is consumed by envy or hatred. Joaquin had no life of his own; his existence was only as the hater of Abel. Even though the protagonist is Joaquin, the book is titled Abel Sánchez because Joaquin's character is formed wholly from his intense feelings toward Abel.

References
 Unamuno, Miguel de (1928): Abel Sanchez, ed. de Carlos A. Charles A. Longhurst, Cátedra, Madrid, 1995.
 Abellán, José Luis (1985): a critical introduction to Abel Sanchez, Castalia, Madrid.
 Zamorano Arregui, Teresa M. (1996): Structure and narrative techniques in the short story of the Generation of 98: Unamuno, Azorin and Baroja, Schedules of RILCA EUNSA, Pamplona, 1998.
 Ayala, Francisco (1974): "The novel of Unamuno," The novel, Galdós and Unamuno, Seix-Barral, Barcelona.
 Amorós, Andrés (1971): "Unamuno: The novel as a search for" Introduction to the contemporary novel. Madrid, Anaya, pp. 265–276.
 Claveria, Carlos (1953): "On the subject of Cain in the work of Unamuno," in José Luis Abellán, Issues of Unamuno, Gredos, Madrid, pp. 97–129.
 Cobb, Christopher H. (1972): "On the development of Abel Sanchez", Journal of the Chair Miguel de Unamuno, XXII
 Diaz-Peterson, Rosendo (1972), "Abel Sánchez de Unamuno, a conflict between life and scholasticism", Arbor, 341.
 Díez, Ricardo (1976): The aesthetic development of Unamuno's novel, Nova-Scholar, Madrid.
 Elizalde, Ignacio (1983): Miguel de Unamuno and his fiction, Caja de Ahorros Provincial de Guipuzcoa, San Sebastian.
 González Egido, Luciano (1987): a critical introduction to Abel Sanchez, Alianza ed., Unamuno Library, 1997.
 Longhurst, Carlos A. (1995): a critical introduction to Abel Sanchez, ed. Cátedra, Madrid.

External pages
 Abel Sánchez: una historia de pasión

1917 novels
Novels by Miguel de Unamuno
Cultural depictions of Cain and Abel
Novels based on the Bible